Bruce Berman (born April 25, 1952) is an American film industry executive and executive producer. He is the chairman and CEO of Village Roadshow Pictures, a position he has held from 1997 to 2021.  His credits as an executive producer include American Sniper, The Lego Movie, The Great Gatsby, the Ocean's trilogy,  Sherlock Holmes and its sequel, Sherlock Holmes: A Game of Shadows, Happy Feet and The Matrix franchise.

Berman is noted for his collection of contemporary American photographs.  In 2004, he was listed among the world's top 25 photography collectors by ARTnews.

Early life and education 
Berman was born to a Jewish family in New York in 1952.  As a teenager, he developed a passion for photography and contemplated a career as a photographer.  He continued to pursue photography throughout high school and into college, where, as a student at Bennington College, he would take frequent road trips to shoot photos of 20th century Americana.

Berman's focus shifted to film after he was accepted at the California Institute of the Arts film school. "I didn't think I could make a living at photography," Berman said in a 2007 interview with the Los Angeles Times. "And when I got into film school, I didn't think I could do both."

In addition to Bennington and CalArts,  Berman attended UCLA, where he graduated cum laude with a degree in United States history. He also attended Georgetown University Law School, earning a juris doctor in 1978.

Career 
Berman began working with Jack Valenti at the MPAA while a student at Georgetown.  After he received his degree, he was hired as an assistant to Peter Guber at Casablanca Filmworks. In 1979, he moved to Universal Pictures, where he worked for Sean Daniel and Joel Silver. Less than three years later, he was named vice president of production.

In 1984, Berman was recruited by Warner Bros. Pictures as a vice president of production, and in 1987 was promoted to senior vice president
of production.  He was named president of theatrical production in 1989 and president of worldwide theatrical production in 1991.   During his tenure at Warner Bros. he produced and distributed films including Goodfellas, Batman Forever, JFK, The Fugitive, The Bodyguard, and Driving Miss Daisy.

In May 1996, Berman started Plan B Entertainment, an independent motion picture company affiliated with Warner Bros. In 1997, Warner Bros entered into a joint venture with Village Roadshow Pictures, and Berman was appointed chairman and CEO.  Considered "one of the industry’s leading financiers and producers of studio released motion pictures," the Village Roadshow and Warner Bros. partnership was extended in 2012 to 2017. The company established a second joint partnership with Sony Pictures Entertainment in 2014.

On September 27, 2021, Berman stepped down as chairman and CEO of Village Roadshow Pictures.

Photography collection
In 1991, Berman was given an Edward S. Curtis photograph of a thatched American Indian shelter as a gift. It inspired him to begin a photography collection, which grew to include more than 2600 works by photographers including William Eggleston, Diane Arbus, Richard Misrach, Dorothea Lange, and Walker Evans. He and his ex-wife Nancy Goliger donated nearly 500 of the photographs to the J. Paul Getty Museum, which in 2007 showcased them in the exhibition Where We Live: Photographs of America From the Berman Collection.

Personal life
Berman has two children; a daughter, with his wife, Lea Russo (an art collection manager), and a son from his previous marriage to Goliger.

Filmography (as executive producer)

References

External links
Village Roadshow Pictures Official Website

Bennington College alumni
American chief executives
American film producers
20th-century American Jews
Georgetown University Law Center alumni
Living people
1952 births
21st-century American Jews